= Tragalassus =

Town of ancient Lycia

Coordinates: 36°19′30″N 29°57′42″E

Tragalassus or Tragalassos was a town of ancient Lycia.

Its site is located near Karabel in Asiatic Turkey.
